Parliamentary elections were held in Haiti on 11 February 1979. Around 300 candidates contested the election, almost all of whom were supporters of President Jean-Claude Duvalier. All but one of the seats in the Chamber of Deputies were won by candidates of the National Unity Party (the sole legal party at the time), whilst the other was won by an independent in Cap-Haïtien.

Results

References

Elections in Haiti
Haiti
1979 in Haiti
One-party elections
Election and referendum articles with incomplete results